is a Japanese manga spin-off series of the long-running Doraemon series.

Synopsis
The series originated from the 1995 short film 2112: The Birth of Doraemon, where the six additional characters were created. The original author, Fujiko F. Fujio, agrees with the story and adds these settings in the original series, even though the settings would not appear in any of the original manga and anime series.

Plot
The Doraemons, or Dora Dora Seven DD7, is an old boys' association of the  that Doraemon attended. All of the seven male members are cat-like robots of the same type; they enjoy dorayaki, but usually add their own seasoning. They have rock-hard heads that they can use as a weapon or to break things. Doraemon has an especially hard head, since he has no other special weapons, and has no ears or hat to get in the way when using this mode of attack. The gadget that can connect them is the Friendship Telecard. They can call each other with the card from anywhere when one of them is in need.

Characters

The Doraemons
The main characters of the series. One or more of them has played a prominent role in several manga volumes and the anime short films.

(Voiced by Nobuyo Ōyama or Chisa Yokoyama)
The titular character and co-protagonist of the main series. He acts as the leader due to being the most optimistic and moderate member of the seven cat robots. In the chapters set when the Doraemons were still in the Robot School (as well as the short film 2112: The Birth of Doraemon), He had yellow skin, which made him resemble his sister, Dorami (who at the time had not yet been manufactured), even more, as well as ears, which had been eaten by mice by the time Doraemon first visited Nobita. He even had a high-pitched voice at that time, which was toned down significantly when he wept uncontrollably after accidentally drinking the Potion of Sadness. He has the normal four-dimensional pocket on his stomach, and likes to have plain dorayaki.

(Voiced by Chisa Yokoyama→ Yoku Shioya→ Keiichi Nanba) 
Nicknamed Kid, he works for a sheriff's deputy in Texas, USA (although in some versions it was changed to a Western-style planet), with the old sheriff captain and his granddaughter Anyi. Kid is also a secret agent of the Time Patrol Police. He is good at quick shooting, same as Nobita, however he has a fear of heights (acrophobia). Kid's weapon of choice is the Air Gun, which appears to be the front muzzle of a giant revolver that is equipped onto Kid's arm (He has no fingers to fire a regular pistol). The Air Gun shoots out a big blast of air that can knock down anyone that gets hit. His variation of Doraemon's four-dimensional Pocket is the  that Kid wears on his head. Kid enjoys his dorayaki with ketchup and mustard on it, much like a hot dog. Though he thinks girls are troublesome most of the time, he is often the sweet (or romance) character when he faces the girls. It is proven when he and Dorami fall in love with each other. In one chapter, he is best known as a samurai. In one of the Doraemons specials, he tries to let Doraemon eat a dorayaki shaped like a mouse but Doraemon declines, due to his fear of mice.
Throughout various chapters of the story, Dora-the-Kid has been described as a symbol of American patriotism.
 Chinese: 王哆啦
(Voiced by Kumiko Nishihara→ Megumi Hayashibara
He is the smartest among the Doraemons and is a master of kung fu. He studies medicine in the Qing Dynasty while he works for an assistant of a doctor of Chinese medicine. His only weakness is that he cannot face girls, even though he has a girlfriend, a female robot called Mimiko. Wang Dora's variation of the four-dimensional pocket is his  on his shirt. He enjoys his dorayaki with rāyu. He is best friends with El Matadora, but they often clashed and are both rivals, so they fight often.
 Arabic: دورا ميد الثالث; Hebrew: דורה-ים-תיכוני השלישי; Persian: دورا-مد ۳
(Voiced by Masaharu Satō
He wears Arabian clothes and forecasts from the tarot. He chose to be a royal consultant in Saudi Arabia on Middle East, but despite being Saudi Arabian, his home is located in Baghdad, Iraq. Needless to say, though, he cannot swim, due to his fear of water. He is also quite proficient in magic and the black arts. His dream is to open a "Water Land" theme park for children who live in desert regions. When he gets angry, he grows several times his size (proportional to how angry he is,) becoming a giant. Dora-Med III's variation of the four-dimensional pocket is his , although he was using the normal four-dimensional pocket on his stomach in the ending to The Mysterious Puzzling Dorapin. He enjoys frozen dorayaki due to his fear of water. Due to his origin when his country is ruled by the Saud family, he is the only member to have a religion (he follows Sunni Islam), making him the first-ever Muslim main character to appear in an anime. He also enjoys Christmas, despite Christmas being banned in Saudi Arabia; his Islamic doctrine is seen as Sufism opposing to majority Wahhabism. In one chapter set during Christmas, he shows a table with a language that uses a Hebrew-like script. However, Dora-med III's place of character had caused a lot of argument, as in one chapter, he appears somewhere in Israel despite he is described as an Arab from Saudi Arabia, the nation which does not recognize Israel.
 Russian: Дора-ников
(Voiced by Teiyū Ichiryūsai→ Toshiharu Sakurai
Dora-nichov is the silent member of the Doraemons, living in Siberia, Russia. As one of the poorest members in The Doraemons, he is a Cossack, whose clothes derived from the historic Siberian Cossack farmers of the past. He often works in Hollywood as a popular movie actor of Werewolf series in the 22nd century, or even travels to the past when Russia is ruled by Tsar Nicholas II, even he comes back to Boris Yeltsin's era. He is taciturn (and can only communicate with growls, etc.) and is extremely sensitive to the cold. He can transform himself into a wolf if he looks at something that looks like the moon; in this form, he can attack enemies by biting or simply wreaking havoc, etc. He is able to blow fire out of his mouth by taking something hot like Tabasco. Dora-nichov uses the  covering his face as an alternative to the four-dimensional pocket. He likes his dorayaki with dog food, however he usually does not eat dorayaki in front of others because the round shape of the snack would accidentally transform him into a wolf and cause him to wreak havoc. His love interest is Momo in the anime, who is a student of the school he attended in; in the manga, his love interest is Nina, a poor Russian singer living in Moscow who later becomes popular thanks to him.

(Voiced by Kazue Ikura→ Kyousei Tsukui→ Ryūsei Nakao) 
He is the strongest guy of the team. He likes napping (siesta), even naps in any danger or anywhere when he wants to. He lives in Barcelona, Spain and works for a roast meat restaurant "Carmen" (which is named after the daughter of the chef, and also El's love interest, Carmen), but also masking himself to save the poor, as an alter-ego Keikai-Dora, a parody of Zorro (This form isn't much different from his original appearance, except with his Magic Cloak pulled over the top of his head). His dream is to become a famous bullfighter, otherwise known as a matador. He likes dorayaki with spaghetti sauce. His Magic Cloak can blow enemies away or deflect bullets, among others. Unlike his friendly rival Wang Dora, he is a playboy among girls. El Matadora is the only other Doraemon robots (other than Doraemon himself) to use the four-dimensional pocket on his stomach, and is the only Doraemons member to have ox horns instead of cat ears.

(Voiced by Mie Suzuki) 
He is the quickest member of the team, who can run very fast and possesses many powerful soccer skills. The Mini-Doras each has a miniature version of Doraemon's four-dimensional pocket that Dora-rinho could take gadgets from; though the gadgets are equally as small as the Mini-Doras. He is also a coach of a Brazilian boy, . He can attack enemies by kicking soccer balls at them. He enjoys dorayaki with Tabasco sauce. He has a cat bell in the form of a soccer ball. In the manga, his soccer-shaped bell turns into an ordinary-looking cat bell when he is angry. He often has derpy eyes and is forgetful due to his clumsiness.
While it has been said that Dora-rinho was inspired by José Mourinho (whose name was inspired from) and Mario Balotelli (whose character personality is based off from), contrary to popular belief, Dora-rinho was neither inspired by any of them, especially since they both have achieved successes well after the spin-off series ended its run in 2001/2003.

Allies

(Voiced by Keiko Yokozawa)
Doraemon's younger sister who first appeared in the main series. She appears prominently in one story where Dorami's graduation ceremony in the Robot School that the Doraemons plan to attend goes awry when a disposed school guardian wakes up and brainwashes all robots. She and Dora-the-Kid are the only ones who managed to escape and free the school from that guardian. They develop a stronger relationship after that incident. She is Dora-the-Kid's love interest and girlfriend.

(Voiced by Ichirō Nagai) 
He grew up with four similar brothers.
He is both a mischievous and treacherous person, but he trusts in The Doraemons despite many of their bad scores in school. He often gives tasks to The Doraemons.

(Voiced by Yūko Minaguchi→ Ai Nonaka) 
One of Doraemon's friends in the Robot School. She was originally a character from Fujiko's story, who is a girlfriend of Doraemon, but broke up with him because she continuously laughed at his lack of ears. In 2112: The Birth of Doraemon, she works as a dancer in the 22nd century. This trait is carried over to the spin-off series. While she initially made fun of Doraemon's earless look like in the main series, she reconciles with Doraemon later on as she admires his new look.
The Mysterious Thief 
(Voiced by Akira Kamiya) 
He is a mysterious cat-like robot thief from France, clearly modelled after Arsène Lupin. He has a wand with a jewel on it used to change the material of one object into another (e.g. paper -> water, rock -> china, etc.). He fears the dark and dogs. He likes eating dorayaki with cheese. Even though he was often misunderstood for a "villain", he always steals for a reason, especially to help the poor.

(Voiced by Kōichi Yamadera) 
One of Doraemon's friend in the Robot School. He is a fantastic cook from Italy. Strangely for his hobby, he wears glasses and cannot see without them. His emotions change quite rarely, and he runs in circles frantically when in panic.

(Voiced by Issei Futamata)
A robot horse that serves as Dora-the-Kid's horse. Before his acquisition by Kid, he was a sheriff in the state of Texas. As he is a robot horse, he has wings which allows him to fly. He often gets annoyed with Kid, but is also very loyal to him.

He is the co-protagonist of the main series, who is the best friend of Doraemon. He occasionally appears in the original manga series, and is also the main protagonist of the The Doraemons Special series.

Enemies
 
(Voiced by Banjō Ginga)
He is a German-Russian professor, who is also the major enemy of the Doraemons. He prominently appears in several anime short films. As an evil doctor/scientist, he tries many different ways to conquer the world. In one chapter of the manga and in the 1997 short film, he tried to steal the Doraemons' friendship cards, but fails.
Jerry
He was once the major enemy of the original manga series. He is a mouse who hides his appearance under a hat and a scarf. If the Doraemons have any actions, Jerry would intervene them and not let them to successfully end the mission. He was eventually defeated by the Doraemons along with Dora Crybaby, Dora Eater, and Dradra Dora. 
Daddy 13
He is the former guardian of the robot school the Doraemons attended, who was the antagonist of one chapter in the manga and in the 1996 short film. He brainwashes the old robots with a device that turns the robots into mindless zombies. Dorami and Dora-the-Kid take measures to save Doraemon and the others from him with help of five other Doreamons. With the problem solved, he protects the school again alongside Mommy 14.
Cursya
Cursya is the flat-dragon like entity created from the fragment of Daddy 13's evil electric waves. Later, it was possessed on El Matadora and adsorbed many robots and also tries to destroy the Doraemons, but fails. Eventually, El Matadora and others liberates from Cursya and it was destroyed at the end.
Jafar
The Grand Vizier and senior advisor of the King of Saudi Arabia, he is a quackery person and same to Ali, his love interest is Jasmine. He dislikes Ali and he has attempted to eliminate Ali anytime he wants. Eventually all these plans soon breaks down thanks for Dora-med III and the other members of The Doraemons.
Black Shark
He is a time criminal with expensive and modern technological advantage. He desires to take over from Pinocchio's reactive alloy, an invention of Mr. Geppetto, to manufacture weaponry for himself.

Supporting characters
Throughout the whole of the manga and anime series of The Doraemons, there has been a significant number of characters that play as supporting roles for The Doraemons. Several characters in this list includes significant real and famous figures. In both the Original and Special manga series, cultural connection and historical legitimacy are highly noticed.

Princess Honey
(Voiced by Sakura Tange)
She is the Princess of the Kingdom of Okashinana, who appears in the 1999 short film. She used to have a happy life with her parents, the King and Queen of the Kingdom, until they caught up in a heavy quarrel and because of family divisions, she does not smile anymore. Wang Dora and El Matadora later assisted Jaidora to make her smile again, with just simply a dorayaki, which she loves eating at youth.
Carmen
She is the Spanish counterpart of Shizuka. She is the daughter of a restaurant owner in Barcelona, which the restaurant is also named after her. She is the only person to know the real identity of El Matadora as Keikai Dora. She is a very good and kind-hearted, often helps El Matadora and his friends. She is the friend of Jaitonio.
Nobinho 
He is the Brazilian counterpart of Nobita. Unlike Nobita, he is more athletic. He is the friend of Dora-rinho, whom he first met when Dora-rinho is still a student at the Robot School. Ever since their second meeting, they become true friends and despite Dora-rinho's forgetful situation, he always cares and never abandon Dora-rinho even in the toughest moment.
Mimimi
(Voiced by Rei Sakuma)
She is Dorapin's girlfriend. A very kind-hearted and good willing, she is the first to discover Dorapin, injured following his attempt to steal jewelry of the Duke of Monaco who is actually the culprit of an evil project. She is also the first to truly realize the real good nature of Dorapin. She has a robot pet dog, which is designed similar to a German shepherd. She appears in the 1997 short film The Puzzling Challenge Letter of the Mysterious Thief Dorapan, where she is imprisoned by Dr. Achimoff. It is her courage that helped Dorapin and The Doraemons to defeat the evil mindset of Achimoff. She later appears in several manga chapters alongside Dorapin.
Jaitonio
He is El Matadora's closest friend, and the Spanish version of Jaian. He has a very bad voice of singing, and relatively strong; but unlike Jaian, Jaitonio is a bit cowardice. His love interest is María, the neighboring girl and also friend of Carmen. He later confesses his love to María, having been assisted by The Doraemons to defeat the machine bull. Eventually they become a family and has children.
Rose DeWitt Bukater
She is the girl who appears in Titanic the Ghost Ship, and just like the 1997 movie version, she plans to commit suicide, but interrupted by Dora-the-Kid, who appears as Jack Dawson. She soon develops a crush on Kid and together with Doraemons, they discover that the ancient demon, Satan, has taken control of the ship and moving the time into their way. With the help of Kid, she is saved and later breaks the Satan's curse, but the ship also begins to sink and when she plans to escape, she is taken by the Satan and falls into the sea. However, in the later part, her granddaughter plays the old violin which reminded Kid of the tune and finally he realizes, Rose has survived and lived till her old age.
Momo
(Voiced by Tomoko Kawakami)
A fellow classmate of The Doraemons, appearing in the 1998 short film. She is initially a bit arrogant, but is rescued by Dora-nichov following an incident. She develops a crush on Dora-nichov since.
Jasmine
A daughter of Saudi King, she is quite depicted to be freer in contrast to heavily tightened Sharia law in Saudi Arabia, and somehow liberal on talking and thinking. She is quite too cautious over Ali, but eventually confesses her feeling to him.
Mimiko
She is a nurse and girlfriend of Wang Dora. She is a very tough, and determined girl, and also the only person that can scare Wang Dora. Nonetheless, she truly cares for Wang Dora, and hinders that she has feelings for him.
Nina
She is a poor girl founded in the bridge at the city of Saint Petersburg. Because she is an orphan, she only has a dog to befriend with until gets harassed by a group of gangster. She has one of the best singing voice, and it is Dora-nikov, disguised as St. Petersburg's Mayor son, Nikolai Ivanov, who founded her talents, run up to protect her from the gang and encourages her to become a top-choice singer in a singing contest in the city. Eventually, Nichov and Nina find themselves each other again, and Nichov remains very supportive for Nina regardless of any consequences. It is hinted that Nina has feeling on him. She is based from Alsou and her opening song is also heavily resembled from Winter dream, Alsou's first song in her career.
Ali
He is a rich person and the boss of Dora-med III. In spite of being the boss, Ali treats Dora-med III like a friend instead and has never considered himself like a boss to Dora-med III, even Dora-med III has utmost respects for him. His love interests in Jasmine, the daughter of Saudi King. With the assist of Dora-med III, he overcomes troubles to finally gets the love he deserves.

(Voiced by Yuri Shiratori)
She is the grand daughter of a train designer and cleaner, and it is her grandpa who inspired her to become a train driver. She appears in the 2000 anime movie Doki Doki Wildcat Engine, and holds the real capsule when Dr. Achimoff attempts to take the capsule that has the viral electricity that can manage to functions and lightens everything that has been destroyed by Achimoff. She later develops a crush on Kid, and she shows deep grateful for Kid because of his action to defend her.
Dora Leonardo da Vinci
He is an old artist whose named after Leonardo da Vinci. He follows the instructor of Principle Teraodai when The Doraemons is taking a holiday trip, and when they are kidnapped by an UFO, Da Vinci shows up and rescues them. He has a magical pen which can help him paint everything to real.
Cleopatra
She is a character from Ancient Egypt. Her love interest is Mark Antony, an ancient Greek warrior who is later caught injured by The Doraemons themselves. In exchange, Nobita is forced to act as Antony in order to prevent an ongoing war between Egypt and Roman Empire, but they [The Doraemons] soon discover that Cleopatria in fact, is an alien woman who sought refuge in Egypt, and Egyptian coffins are in fact, a machine bed that can guarantee them to stay long like a death one. Nonetheless, Cleopatra always loves Antony, which Nobita has finally helped achieving it.
Spica
She is the Empress of the Mirage Kingdom, a mysterious Uyghur Kingdom that has disappeared thousand years ago in Taklamakan Desert. Depicted as an Empress, she first believes on what a mysterious "Authority" to sacrifice Nobita, until Nobita is rescued. Upon what happened, The Doraemons discover a dark secret that the Mirage Kingdom has, in fact, achieved a high level of technological science that cannot be seen anywhere in the ancient world, and the so-called "Authority" in fact was a scientist who created the nuclear reactor (which is called as "Black Magic" by Spica), but was killed following the explosion and effectively disappeared whole Kingdom. After successful disable a lot of problem, Spica is unable to return to the modern world, because she and the Kingdom have stayed out from the line for thousand years. She decides to stay in the Kingdom. Throughout the story, Dora-med III cares for her the most, and has been deeply shocked by the fact that she cannot return.
Raúl and Riril
They are brother and sister from a traditional Aztec family working as guardians protecting the masks in a Mexican pyramid when Dora-nichov is founded to have been affected by the warrior mask. Eventually, Raúl also gets affected but in an even more dangerous due to a mistake from Nobita, and he almost kills all of them until Riril wears the Queen's mask, successfully disables the warrior mask.
Mr. Geppetto
An inventor and instrumental on the development of robot cat. For all seven members of The Doraemons, he is accredited for manufacturing them. He holds the reactive alloy, one of his specific invention which can be used to make everything longer automatically, if someone is lying. Because of this, Black Shark is determined to take away his invention. He also manufactures Pinocchio, with his son's human brain, while he is trying to cure the cancer for his son which will later end up successful.
Pinocchio
A robot himself, however, he keeps a secret that a time criminal, Black Shark, is seeking, the reactive alloy of Mr. Geppetto, on his nose. Although he is a robot, his brain is belonged to Geppetto's son. He is injured following an attempt to protect The Doraemons, but is later saved.
Carlo Collodi
He is a boy who lives in 19th century Florence. When The Doraemons first meet him, he is totally not aware, but after The Doraemons' attention to seek Mr. Geppetto and Pinocchio, he is the first to know. In fact, he has kept a secret relations with both of them, until he discovers The Doraemons and Mr. Geppetto have a close relations. He follows both of them later, in the counter against Black Shark, and even visits Pinocchio being hospitalized. Because of this experience, he becomes inspired and will mark his path to become one of Italy's greatest authors in the history, writing The Adventures of Pinocchio, which Wang Dora later discovers out. He later participates in the Italian unification.

Manga
There were three versions of volumes in the The Doraemons manga:

Original
First published in December 1995, the series follows on the life and adventures of the Doraemons, with some of the chapters adapting the short film anime stories.

Special
There is a 12-volume spin-off titled , written by Masaru Miyazaki and illustrated by Yukihiro Mitani. First published in December 1996, the series has a similar premise to the original The Doraemons, albeit with a much darker, more serious and dramatic tone. It mainly focuses on Nobita Nobi's adventures with the Doraemons. The adventures involve many fictional (such as Arsene Lupin, Pinocchio, etc...) and real-life historical figures (Cleopatra, Nostradamus, etc...), as well as the events happened in real life.

Robot School Memories
The Doraemons Special: Robot Training School (3 volumes): A spin-off focusing on The Doraemons' past journeys in the Robot School, created by Yukihiro Mitani. The first volume of the series published in May 1999.

Anime

The Doraemons characters made their anime debut in the 1995 short film 2112: The Birth of Doraemon. There are several short animated films of The Doraemons, released alongside the Doraemon theatrical movies from 1996 to 2002.

Video game
The Doraemons were prominently featured in the 1995 Japan-only Doraemon video game Doraemon Yuujou Densetsu, released on April 7, 1995 for the 3DO Interactive Multiplayer.

See also
 Doraemon

References

External links
 Doraemon Characters  

Doraemon